The National Parks: America's Best Idea is a 2009 television documentary miniseries by director/producer Ken Burns and producer/writer Dayton Duncan which features the United States National Park system and traces the system's history. The series won two 2010 Emmy Awards; one for Outstanding Nonfiction Series and one for Outstanding Writing for Nonfiction Programming in Episode 2 "The Last Refuge". A companion book was released alongside.

Cast
Peter Coyote is the narrator of all episodes, with first-person voices supplied by Adam Arkin, Philip Bosco, Kevin Conway, Andy García, Tom Hanks, Derek Jacobi, Clay Jenkinson, John Lithgow, Josh Lucas, Carolyn McCormick, Campbell Scott, Gene Jones, George Takei, Eli Wallach and Sam Waterston. Shelton Johnson, a National Park ranger, was also featured.

Episodes

Some foreign releases of the series – notably Australia – have separated it into 12 one-hour-long episodes.

Release

The series was previewed in a seven-minute segment at the end of the fourth episode of Burns's 2007 PBS documentary, The War.  The first two-hour episode premiered at the Hopkins Center for the Arts at Dartmouth College on April 17, 2009.  Episodes debuted daily, airing from Sunday, September 27 to Friday, October 2, with full episodes online the following day.

Critical reception 
The National Parks: America's Best Idea has received generally positive reviews from television critics. Mark Rahner of The Seattle Times wrote, "Stirring and sublime."

References

External links
Official website from Public Broadcasting Service
Documentary trailer, Q&A with Ken Burns and Dayton Duncan from the National Park Foundation
Learn more about America's Best Idea from National Park Service Archeology Program 
The National Parks: America's Best Idea at the Internet Movie Database

2000s American documentary television series
National Park Service
Films directed by Ken Burns